Syrnola pumilio is a species of sea snail, a marine gastropod mollusk in the family Pyramidellidae, the pyrams and their allies.

Description
The length of the shell measures 6.3 mm.

Distribution
This marine species is endemic to the Eastern Atlantic off St. Helena.

References

External links
 To Encyclopedia of Life
 To World Register of Marine Species

Pyramidellidae
Gastropods described in 1890